Mr. Medhavi (English translation: Mr. Genius) is a 2008 Telugu film, directed by G. Neelakanta Reddy. The film stars Raja Abel, Genelia D'Souza and Sonu Sood.

Plot
A young Vishwak (Raja) meets Swetha (Genelia) who comes from Canada on a vacation to her grandmother's place. She goes to school for the time being at the local school, where she meets Vishwak. That's when a one-sided love blossoms for Vishwak and he grows in love with Swetha.

However, given his humble background, life teaches him to be calculated in whatever he does. He soon masters the art of making the best for himself out of any given situation. Destiny brings him to the company that is owned by Swetha's father. Here, the old friends meet once again. But this time around, Swetha is the boss's daughter and dreams of setting up a pharmaceutical company. That's when Swetha and Vishwak get to work and spend time together.

While Vishwak works his way towards making Swetha love him, she springs a surprise on him by announcing that she is head over heels in love with Sidarth (Sonu Sood), a millionaire-turned-HR guru. Seeing his game plan backfire, Vishwak tries his best to take Swetha's mind off Sidarth. But the more he tries, the more she is convinced she has found her ideal man.

Will Vishwak gain or lose his love?

Cast
Genelia D'Souza as Swetha
Raja as Vishwak
Sonu Sood as Siddharth
Bhargavi as Sheela
Tanikella Bharani
Brahmanandam
Suman
Dharmavarapu Subramanyam
Suman Setty
Sudha
Hema

Soundtrack

References

External links 
 

2000s Telugu-language films
2008 films